The 2022 CAF Women's Champions League Final was the final match of the 2022 CAF Women's Champions League, the second edition of Africa's premier women's club football tournament organised by CAF. It was played at Prince Moulay Abdellah Stadium in Rabat, Morocco on 13 November 2022.

Teams

Venue
The final of the second CAF Women's Champions League will be played as a single match at a pre-selected venue by CAF, similar to the format used in the first edition 2021 CAF WCL. The Prince Moulay Abdellah Stadium in Rabat, Morocco, home of Botola (Moroccan championship) side AS FAR men and women, was selected to host the final.

Road to the final

Match

Details 
The final match will helds after playing the Group stages and the semi-finals of the 2022 CAF Women's Champions League final tournament helds in Rabat.

References

External links
The second CAF Women's Champions League - cafonline.com

Final
November 2022 sports events in Africa
Sports competitions in Morocco
International club association football competitions hosted by Morocco